("The noble heart"), WAB 66, is a song composed by Anton Bruckner in December 1857 during his stay in Linz. During his stay in St. Florian, Bruckner had already composed a first setting of the song for men's choir, WAB 65.

History 
Bruckner composed the second setting of the work on the same text of Ernst Marinelli in December 1857 during his stay in Linz. It is not known whether the work, which was composed possibly on request of Liedertafel Frohsinn for a performance as mixed choir, was performed during Bruckner's life.

The original manuscript of the work is lost. A sketch of the work is stored in the archive of Enns.

Music 
The second stetting of Das edle Herz is in the same key and is 8-bars shorter than the first setting of the song.

The score ends with a 4-bar, instead of 13-bar, chorale.

Discography 
There is as yet no commercial recording of this second setting of Das edle Herz.

Note: A performance by Stephen Cleobury with the BBC Choir (2011) is put in the Bruckner Archive: Charter Oak COR-2178 (box of 2 CDs).

References

Sources 
 August Göllerich, Anton Bruckner. Ein Lebens- und Schaffens-Bild,  – posthumous edited by Max Auer by G. Bosse, Regensburg, 1932
 Anton Bruckner – Sämtliche Werke, Band XXIII/2:  Weltliche Chorwerke (1843–1893), Musikwissenschaftlicher Verlag der Internationalen Bruckner-Gesellschaft, Angela Pachovsky and Anton Reinthaler (Editor), Vienna, 1989
 Cornelis van Zwol, Anton Bruckner 1824–1896 – Leven en werken, uitg. Thoth, Bussum, Netherlands, 2012. 
 Uwe Harten, Anton Bruckner. Ein Handbuch. , Salzburg, 1996. .
 Crawford Howie, Anton Bruckner - A documentary biography, online revised edition

External links 
 
 Das edle Herz A-Dur, WAB 66 – Critical discography by Hans Roelofs 

Weltliche Chorwerke by Anton Bruckner
1857 compositions
Compositions in A major